Walter "Wally" Freeman (6 September 1893 – October 1987) was a British athlete. He competed in the men's individual cross country event at the 1920 Summer Olympics.

References

1893 births
1987 deaths
Athletes (track and field) at the 1920 Summer Olympics
British male long-distance runners
Olympic athletes of Great Britain
Sportspeople from Redditch
Olympic cross country runners